Lakeside Union School District is a public school district in the East County area of San Diego County, California, United States. It includes six elementary schools (K–5) two middle schools (6–8)  two charter schools (k-8 and 9–12) and three preschools. It is governed by an elected five-member board.  Lakeside prepares students with 21st Century skills by providing students with a districtwide visual and performing arts focus and opportunities to engage in education through language immersion in Spanish and/or Mandarin.

The school district has 8 schools:

Riverview elementary, Lakeview elementary, Lemon Crest elementary, Eucalyptus hills Elementary, Lakeside farms Elementary, Lindo Park Elementary, Lakeside middle school, and Tierra del sol middle school.

The district's origins date to 1889.

With measures like proposition R, if it scales through, the schools within the district are to become further improved. This means safer security, repairs of old facilities and better equipment. This also is in addition to the district partnering with the local sheriffs for security within the area.

References

External links 
 

School districts in San Diego County, California
1890 establishments in California
School districts established in 1890